Delphinella strobiligena is a species of fungus in the family Dothioraceae.

References

External links

Fungi described in 1962
Fungi of Croatia
Fungi of Spain
Dothideales